Homona apiletica is a species of moth of the family Tortricidae. It is found in China.

References

Moths described in 1934
Homona (moth)